It's Everly Time is the third studio album by American singing duo The Everly Brothers, released in 1960. It peaked at No. 9 on the Billboard Pop albums chart. It's Everly Time was their first album on Warner Bros. after leaving the independent label Cadence. Though Warner Brothers was based in Los Angeles, they continued to record in Nashville with top session players, laying down all the dozen tracks over the course of five sessions in March 1960.

Reception

Writing for Allmusic, music critic Richie Unterberger wrote of the album "While the Everlys' sound was diluted by more elaborate production in the '60s, that's not at all true on this LP, which is one of their very best. Not a stiff among the 12 tracks..."

Track listing

Personnel
Don Everly – guitar, vocals
Phil Everly – guitar, vocals
Chet Atkins, "Sugarfoot" Garland - electric guitar
James Clayton - steel guitar
Floyd T. "Lightnin'" Chance - bass
Floyd Cramer or Marvin H. Hughes - piano
"Buddy" Harman Jr. - drums

References

External links
Collector's Choice Music reissue liner notes by Richie Unterberger.

The Everly Brothers albums
1960 albums
Warner Records albums